The Mad River Valley Rural Historic District encompasses a large rural landscape in northern Waitsfield and southern Moretown, Vermont. The district was listed on the National Register of Historic Places in 1994.

Description and history
Vermont's Mad River is a north-flowing tributary of the Winooski River, which feeds Lake Champlain at Burlington.  The historic district, with the river meandering through its middle is roughly bounded on the east by North Road, the west by Vermont Route 100, and the south by Tremblay Road.  Its northern boundary is roughly Downsville Brook, an east-flowing tributary in Moretown.  This area is one of the broader stretches of the river's flood plain, bounded at the northern and southern ends by terrain that narrows the river's passage.  It is roughly bisected by Meadow Road, which crosses the river at one of the area's oldest crossing sites.

This section of the Mad River valley was populated in the 1780s by white settlers, drawn by its agricultural potential.  The earliest road, roughly North Road to the Meadow Road crossing, was laid out by 1796, and the Mad River Turnpike (now Vermont Route 100, and Route 100B from their junction) was opened in 1807.  Early farmers were generally diversified in their early production, and had begun focusing on cattle and Morgan horses by the mid-19th century.  With the introduction of the railroad in a neighboring valley, and the development of refrigerated rail cars later in the 19th century, the area's farmers turned to the production of butter.  It is during this period that many of the area farmsteads achieved their present form, although many of the active ones have had modern facilities added.  Prominent examples of farmsteads are found on Vermont 100 and North Road, generally set outside the flood plain, because the river has historically flooded on numerous occasions.

See also

National Register of Historic Places listings in Washington County, Vermont

References

Historic districts on the National Register of Historic Places in Vermont
National Register of Historic Places in Washington County, Vermont
Greek Revival architecture in Vermont
Gothic Revival architecture in Vermont
Historic districts in Washington County, Vermont
Waitsfield, Vermont
Moretown, Vermont